The District of Gallarate was one of the four divisions of the , the province of Milan during the Napoleonic Italian Republic. It received the numeral IV and its capital was Gallarate.

The district
Founded on May 13, 1801, it had a population of 111,120 inhabitants. It was composed by the communes of Gallarate and other communes in the northwestern part of the department.

Sources
 Historical database of Lombard laws (it.)

Former departments of France in Italy
History of Lombardy
Province of Varese
1801 establishments in Europe
Kingdom of Italy (Napoleonic)